Wendell Lee Mobley (born in Celina, Ohio) is an American country music songwriter. He has written No. 1 hits for Rascal Flatts and Kenny Chesney.

He began playing in local bands before moving to Nashville, Tennessee, where he found a job playing guitar for Jack Greene and Alabama. After having his songs recorded by Joe Diffie and Kenny Rogers, he became a full-time songwriter.

Mobley's first cut as a single was Alabama's "We Can't Love Like This Anymore" in 1994. Among his cuts are the number 1 singles "How Forever Feels" and "There Goes My Life" by Kenny Chesney; "Fast Cars and Freedom", "Take Me There" and "Banjo" by Rascal Flatts; and "How Country Feels" by Randy Houser.

References

American country songwriters
American male songwriters
Living people
People from Celina, Ohio
Songwriters from Ohio
People from Nashville, Tennessee
Year of birth missing (living people)